Tarik Elyounoussi (born 23 February 1988) is a professional footballer who plays for Japanese club Shonan Bellmare. His preferred position is a forward, but he can also play as a winger.

Club career
Born in Al Hoceima, Morocco, Elyounoussi moved to Norway with his family when he was 11 years old. He started playing football in the club Nylende in Fredrikstad, and then joined Trosvik, in which many of the young players in the Fredrikstad youth team have their roots.

He was considered to be the greatest talent Fredrikstad has produced in decades. As such he was awarded the Norwegian Young Player of the Year trophy in 2006 and 2007, after two great seasons in the league, and a Norwegian football cup trophy.

SC Heerenveen
Elyounoussi was sought after by various Premier League clubs in the summer of 2008. However Fredrikstad accepted a bid on around €4 million from French club Le Mans on 8 July. But Elyounoussi had no interest in joining Le Mans. A few weeks later Elyounoussi signed a five-year contract with Heerenveen worth €3.5 million, on 22 July. He joined Heerenveen in August 2008.

He scored in his debut match against FC Volendam. He also netted an important equalizer for Heerenveen in their first round UEFA Cup match away against Vitória F.C., and his second league goal came against NEC Nijmegen.

Return to Norway
On 19 February 2010, Lillestrøm SK loaned the 21-year-old talented forward until the end of season from SC Heerenveen.

On 7 January 2011, Elyounoussi returned to Fredrikstad FK and Tippeligaen.

Elyounoussi signed for Rosenborg on 9 August 2012, binding him to the club to the end of the 2015 season. Elyounoussi and Mikkel Diskerud's transfers was announced at half time during the UEFA Europa League qualifier against Servette.

1899 Hoffenheim
Rosenborg announced on 18 June 2013 that they had sold Elyounoussi to Hoffenheim, and bought Alexander Søderlund from Haugesund as his replacement. Elyounoussi joined the German side after Rosenborg's match against Strømsgodset on 22 June.

Olympiacos
Olympiacos announced that this club had agreement with TSG Hoffenheim for signing Tarik Elyounoussi on 26 August with the transfer fee estimated to €1 million. On 11 September 2016, he scored his first goal with the club in a hammering 6-1 home win against Veria F.C. He played a vital role in the club, in acquiring the 7th consecutive Super League title.

Qarabağ
On 31 August 2017, Azerbaijani champions Qarabağ FK signed Elyounoussi on loan until the end of 2017–18 season. The 30-year-old Moroccan-born Norwegian international was a member of Qarabağ during the first half of 2017–18 season, on loan from the Reds, but made only seven official performances in all competitions and failed to impress.

AIK
On 30 January 2018, Swedish outfit AIK announced the transfer of Elyounoussi from Olympiacos on a two-year deal; details of the fees involved have not been disclosed. In 2018, he won the Swedish league, Allsvenskan, together with AIK.

Shonan Bellmare
On 12 January 2020, Japanese side Shonan Bellmare announced the transfer of Elyounoussi from AIK on a two-year deal; details of the fees involved were not disclosed. He scored his first goal for the club in a 3–1 defeat to Kawasaki Frontale on 26 July 2020.

International career
Elyounoussi scored on his debut for the national team against Uruguay on 28 May 2008 after only four minutes on the pitch; this was one of the fastest ever debut goal on the national team. He scored his second national team goal on 15 January 2012, in the opening match of 2012 King's Cup against Denmark, which was his fifth cap for Norway.

Elyounoussi was chosen as captain for the international friendlies against South Africa and Zambia in January 2013, and scored the winning goal in the 1–0 victory against South Africa.

Personal life
Elyounoussi was born in Morocco, he represents the Norway national team. Elyounoussi is he cousin of Mohamed Elyounoussi, who is also a Norwegian international footballer.

Career statistics

Club

International

Scores and results list Norway's goal tally first, score column indicates score after each Elyounoussi goal.

Honours
Fredrikstad
Norwegian Football Cup: 2006

SC Heerenveen
KNVB Cup: 2008–09

Olympiacos
Super League Greece: 2016–17

AIK
Allsvenskan: 2018

Individual
Norwegian Young Player of the Year:  2006, 2007

References

External links

1988 births
Living people
People from Al Hoceima
Sportspeople from Fredrikstad
Moroccan emigrants to Norway
Naturalised citizens of Norway
Norwegian footballers
Moroccan footballers
Norway international footballers
Norway under-21 international footballers
Fredrikstad FK players
SC Heerenveen players
Lillestrøm SK players
Rosenborg BK players
TSG 1899 Hoffenheim players
Olympiacos F.C. players
Qarabağ FK players
AIK Fotboll players
Shonan Bellmare players
Eliteserien players
Eredivisie players
Bundesliga players
Super League Greece players
Azerbaijan Premier League players
Allsvenskan players
J1 League players
Norwegian expatriate footballers
Expatriate footballers in the Netherlands
Norwegian expatriate sportspeople in the Netherlands
Expatriate footballers in Germany
Norwegian expatriate sportspeople in Germany
Expatriate footballers in Azerbaijan
Norwegian expatriate sportspeople in Azerbaijan
Expatriate footballers in Greece
Norwegian expatriate sportspeople in Greece
Expatriate footballers in Sweden
Norwegian expatriate sportspeople in Sweden
Expatriate footballers in Japan
Norwegian expatriate sportspeople in Japan
Norwegian people of Moroccan descent
Association football midfielders
Association football wingers
Association football forwards
Riffian people